The 1960–61 season was the 46th in the history of the Isthmian League, an English football competition.

Bromley were champions, winning their fourth Isthmian League title.

League table

References

Isthmian League seasons
I